Paul John McCormick (April 23, 1879 – December 2, 1960) was a United States district judge of the United States District Court for the Southern District of California.

Education and career

Born in New York City, New York, McCormick attended St. Ignatius College (now the University of San Francisco) and read law to enter the bar in 1900. He was in private practice in Los Angeles, California from 1900 to 1905. He was an assistant district attorney of Los Angeles County, California from 1905 to 1910, thereafter serving as a Judge of the Los Angeles County Superior Court until 1921, and as an Associate Justice of the District Court of Appeal of California from 1921 to 1924.

Federal judicial service

On February 7, 1924, McCormick was nominated by President Calvin Coolidge to a seat on the United States District Court for the Southern District of California vacated by Judge Oscar A. Trippet. McCormick was confirmed by the United States Senate on February 11, 1924, and received his commission the same day. He served as Chief Judge from 1948 to 1951. He assumed senior status on September 1, 1951, serving in that capacity until his death on December 2, 1960.

Wickersham Commission

In 1929, President Herbert Hoover appointed McCormick as one of the eleven primary members of the Wickersham Commission on issues relating to law enforcement, criminal activity, police brutality, and Prohibition.

See also
 James Stuart McKnight, Los Angeles City Council member sentenced by McCormick

References

Sources
 
 Paul John McCormick at Courtlistener.com
 A short bio of Paul John McCormick at openjurist.org

1879 births
1960 deaths
Judges of the United States District Court for the Southern District of California
United States district court judges appointed by Calvin Coolidge
20th-century American judges
United States federal judges admitted to the practice of law by reading law